The BOK-1 (Byuro Osobykh Konstrooktsiy - bureau of special design), (a.k.a. SS (Stratosfernii Samolyet – stratospheric aircraft)), was an experimental high-altitude aircraft designed and built in the USSR from 1934.

Development 
The BOK was formed as part of TsAGI (Tsentrahl'nyy Aerodinamicheskiy i Ghidrodinamicheskiy Institoot- central aerodynamics and hydrodynamics institute) on the orders of the Soviet Revolutionary Military Council in Dec 1930. One of the first tasks of BOK was to design and build the hermetically sealed gondola of the SSSR-1 high-altitude balloon. BOK engineers were sent to the Junkers factory at Dessau to study the Junkers Ju 49 which was the first aircraft fitted with a sealed cabin for high-altitude flight. The gondola for the SSSR-1 was designed, built and flown successfully to an altitude of 18,000m in 1933. 
The BOK was then assigned the task of applying the 'hermetic' cabin to an aircraft with the Tupolev RD chosen as the basis of the BOK-1. A sealed 1.8 m3 cylindrical cabin constructed from  D1 light alloy was fitted to a modified RD airframe.

The cabin had convex bulkheads front and rear with the main entry hatch in the roof and emergency exit through a porthole at the rear. Seven portholes gave sufficient vision with five for the pilot and two for the radio operator/observer. With the cabin structure sealed, cabin air was dumped overboard at a controlled rate through a dump valve and replaced with oxygen, from storage bottles, maintaining oxygen levels roughly constant. Heating was supplied through radiators in the engine cooling circuit, to keep the cabin between 15 and 18 °C.

The RD airframe was modified with reduced span wings, restressed structure for lower gross weight, fixed spatted single mainwheels, an M-34RN engine and three-bladed propeller, and later an M-34RNV engine and four-bladed propeller. Built at GAZ-35 the BOK-1 was first flown by I.F. Petrov in the summer of 1936 and reached a maximum altitude of 14,000 m in 1938.

Variants 
 BOK-7 -  A development of the BOK-1,powered by an M-34FRN+2 turbochargers, with an integral pressure cabin (GK) with thicker skins and slimmer profile, pressurised to 0.28 kg/cm^3 by engine driven blower. Two aircraft built using RD airframe with full span wings, dorsal  domes with portholes in the roof of the cabin to give adequate vision for pilot and observer. Tests carried out with the armament for the BOK-8.
 BOK-8 – The second BOK-7 aircraft was modified as the BOK-8 high-altitude reconnaissance bomber. The defensive armament of  a remote controlled barbette with a ShKAS machine-gun aimed by a Rezunov optical sight, linked electro-mechanically with synchro feedback,  in the rear dome of the pressure cabin. Flight trials were carried out circa 1939.
 BOK-11 – Believed to be a reconnaissance aircraft using a BOK-8 airframe powered by a Charomskii M-40 (Ach-30) diesel engine.
 BOK-15 - Two extremely long-range high-altitude research aircraft powered by ACh-30 diesel engines, with retractable undercarriage for minimum drag. Flying at  the range was to be . The aircraft were built during 1938–1939 with the first aircraft flown on 12 March 1940 by A.B. Yumashyev and the second by G.F. Baidyukov.

Specifications (BOK-1 M-34RNV)

See also

References

 Gunston, Bill. “The Osprey Encyclopaedia of Russian Aircraft 1875–1995”. London, Osprey. 1995. 
 Taylor, Michael J.H. . “ Jane's Encyclopedia of Aviation. Studio Editions. London. 1989.  

1930s Soviet experimental aircraft
Germany–Soviet Union relations